SixStarHotel, or Six Star Hotel, are an alternative rock band from Belfast, Northern Ireland. They formed in 2001. The group released three self-financed EPs—Circus Music, Everyone's a Critic, These Rosewood Theories—before moving on to full-length albums. They released their debut album A Kind of Crusade in January 2007 and their second album Tides and Tides in December 2009.

History
The band started out with founding members, David Clements and Neil Gillespie, playing together in the attic in Neil's house to the radio and making tape recordings of their efforts. Childhood friends, it was merely a way of having fun together yet they soon discovered that this may be more than just a hobby. They recruited Timothy Anderson a school mate of David's and Matt Minford, another of David's friends and SixStarHotel was born. The band then played at Forfey Festival in 2006, a year before their debut album.

The group have toured Northern Ireland heavily since their formation and their early EP releases were met with acclaim from local press. In October 2004 the band relocated to Glasgow, Scotland and started working full-time at the band. The following months of hard touring up and down the UK led to 2006 seeing them recording tracks with esteemed producers Richard Flack (Queens of the Stone Age, Foo Fighters) and Mark Aubrey (Bloc Party). They also completed a successful month-long tour of Denmark and shared stages with, among others, You Say Party! We Say Die! and The Young Knives as well as filling Belfast venue The Limelight in December 2006.

2007 saw the band release their debut album. Recorded in Belfast with producer Rocky O'Reilly of Oppenheimer, entitled A Kind Of Crusade and self-released through the band's own record label We Collect Records. The album was also made available for digital download as of 12 November 2007, the first such release for the band. Touring in support of the album was both heavy and successful. The album tour saw the band return to Denmark for another month-long tour, as well as branching out into the festival circuit, such as the Flevo Festival in the Netherlands. There has also been a well-received UK tour and airplay in student radio stations from Edinburgh to Leeds. A discussion of the album and their general ethos with Sstv.tv from October 2006 is available.

The early part of 2008 was marked with the usual tours of mainland UK however touring was limited from the middle of the year due to first Matt and then David getting married. Further, Tim and Neil relocated to live in London as of October. The band continued writing and tracking new songs for a new album.

With their new album, titled Tides And Tides, set for a release on 7 December 2009 initially via iTunes, and then on 10 December 2009 in physical form, the band released a free download of the first single on the album on 9 November 2009. Called "Kid Go Get It", the song was made available through their website and Myspace site, accompanied by the companion video for the song. Tides and Tides boasts a wide range of new material and a move away from the band's earlier, more Biffy Clyro influenced, releases. The album was mixed by Brad Wood in Los Angeles, who declared himself a fan of the band after listening to the mixes sent to him. The album saw the band play a set of three pre-release shows over the weekend of 4–6 December in Belfast, London and Glasgow.

Other projects
Aside from the band, the members have many varied artistic involvements. In late 2006/early 2007 the band set up their own record label We Collect Records with all four members of the band actively involved in the day-to-day running of the label.

David Clements performs solo shows as David C. Clements (formerly Captain Cameron) alongside his live band "The Metrolsexuals" and has released two EPs, the latter of the which was released through We Collect Records. More of his music can be found at his Myspace.

Since 2006, Matt Minford has been the main organiser of an annual performing arts festival, Forfey Festival. The festival plays host to acts from Ireland, the UK and further afield and also showcases local artists. Aside from this Matt has been heavily involved with other local Northern Ireland acts such as Bluetree and Kowalski in an event management role.

Gillespie has made guest appearances on the drum stool for acts such as David McNair (who produced the band's These Rosewood Theories EP) and is also heavily involved in the design of the band's merchandise and album covers. Both Gillespie and Clements have appeared on stage throughout 2008 with The Lowly Knights. Gillespie has an endorsement deal with C&C drums. He has also taken tentative steps into the world of acting, appearing in the three part maritime action adventure, Captain Beardseye as the eponymous hero. The show also featured a walk on appearance from Clements as Benny Baritone.

In 2010 Gillespie was part of the original line up on the London based Cymbals_(British_band) but he left the group after their second album Age of Fracture in 2014.

Anderson is involved in myriad number of side-projects, the most recent of which are You Will Live Disco, Our Singapore Friends and The Motion Union.

Discography
EPs
Circus Music
Everyone's a Critic
These Rosewood Theories
Albums
A Kind of Crusade
Tides And Tides (2009)

Influences
The following have all been cited as strong influences in SixStarHotel's music.
Les Savy Fav
Mewithoutyou
At the Drive-In
Mew

References

External links
Official Website
Band Interview

Alternative rock groups from Northern Ireland
Musical quartets